The flag of Colorado was officially adopted to represent the U.S. state of Colorado on June 5, 1911. The flag, designed by Andrew Carlisle Carson, consists of a fess design of three horizontal stripes of equal width, with the top and bottom stripes colored blue, and the middle stripe colored white. A circular red "C", filled with a golden disk, sits atop the stripes. All aspects of the flag contain symbolism related to the state, as the blue is meant to represent the sky, the gold the abundant sunshine the state receives, the white the snowcapped Rocky Mountains, and the red the "ruddy" earth. The gold and white portions of the flag also represent the state's gold and silver mining industries, respectively.

The state had one previous official flag before the current one, from 1907 to 1911. The Denver chapter of the Daughters of the American Revolution, unaware that this flag existed, wanted to create a flag for the state and settled on a red and white colored one, designed with the help of then-state senator William H. Sharpley. This flag was presented to the legislature but, because it was less popular than Carson's design, it was replaced. The new design passed the Senate and House of Representatives on April 25 and May 6, 1911, respectively. The flag made its public debut at a parade on May 30, 1911, and was officially adopted on June 5, 1911. Further revisions were made by the legislature on February 28, 1929, to specify the exact colors used and on March 31, 1964, to specify the size and positioning of the letter "C" and gold disk.

History
Colorado joined the union as the 38th state with the approval of President Ulysses S. Grant on August 1, 1876. An unofficial banner, consisting simply of the state seal on a blue background, was used beginning that year. The state did not have an official flag until 1907, when a design incorporating parts of the state seal complete with the state motto, Latin for "Nothing without Providence or Deity", was adopted. This flag proved unpopular, as only one physical flag was ever produced and it was never flown publicly. Rather, it sat unused in a custodial closet within the Colorado State Capitol Building.

The origin of the modern flag of Colorado can be traced to a meeting of the Denver chapter of the Daughters of the American Revolution (DAR) held on November 14, 1910. Those present at the meeting were unaware of the flag that had been adopted three years earlier, and came up with the idea to design a flag for the state under the impression that none existed. The DAR members created a committee which was receiving designs by the next month, and decided to support one design that contained three horizontal stripes of red, white, and red, with the state seal in the middle. Then-state senator William H. Sharpley assisted in getting the flag bill through the legislature with relative ease, though the design ultimately proved unpopular. A new design was submitted by Andrew Carlisle Carson, with horizontal stripes of blue, white, and blue, with a red "C" and a gold disk within the "C" both in the middle and offset slightly to the hoist side of the flag.

This design proved far more popular among the legislature than the initial proposal, and passed the Colorado Senate as Senate Bill 118 with "no opposition" on April 25, 1911. The bill was sent to the Colorado House of Representatives and passed easily on May 6, 1911. The flag made its public debut at the end of that month, on May 30, as a part of a Grand Army of the Republic parade, and was officially approved by the General Assembly as a whole on June 5, 1911, at which point it became the new flag of the state of Colorado. The wording of the bill that was passed included a permission for the use of the flag by all citizens, meaning the design could be used on items that were not explicitly flags.

However, the legislature did not specify the size of the "C" or the exact shade of blue or red. Therefore, some flags utilized slightly different colors. On February 28, 1929, the General Assembly added to the description of the flag that the blue and red would be the same colors as those found on the national flag. Further discrepancies arose in the size of the "C" and gold disksome designs had the "C" wholly within the center stripe, while some had the "C" over parts of each blue stripe. To resolve this, on March 31, 1964, the legislature further dictated the diameter of the gold disc to be equal to the width of the center stripe. This final clarification brought about the design that is in use today.

Design and symbolism
Within Senate Bill 118, which passed the Colorado Senate on May 6, 1911, ten specific points of symbolism within the flag were laid out. The red letter "C" stands for three things: the name of the state, "Colorado", the word "centennial", referring to Colorado's accession to statehood in 1876, the year of the United States' centennial; and "columbine", referring to the state flower. The gold disk in the center of the "C" represents not only the sunshine the state receives (which totals nearly 300 days annually), but also gold and the gold mining industry in the state. The blue stripes represent the sky, and the white stripes represent both the peaks of the Rocky Mountains and silver, as well as the resulting mining industry; the blue and white stripes together also represent the colors of the columbine flower. Other symbolism apart from the senate bill has been noted, including the red coloring of the "C" standing for the "ruddy" earth that covers much of the state's terrain. The flag is laid out in a 2:3 ratio, specifically with "a width of two-thirds of its length". Legislation passed in 1964 specified that the diameter of the yellow disc should be equal to that of the white stripe, while the red letter "C" occupies two-thirds of the width of the entire flag.

In a 2001 survey of 72 state, provincial, and territorial flags conducted by the North American Vexillological Association, Colorado's flag was ranked sixteenth, with a score of 6.83 (the winner, New Mexico, scored 8.61).

Protocol
The state of Colorado and the office of the governor have laid out rules as to when the flag can be flown at half-staff and protocol for various other situations. The governor may order the flag lowered to half-staff, along with the national flag, on the day of the funeral of a Colorado service member, at the request of the president (usually for the death of a federal government official or a national tragedy), or on the day of the funeral of a state government official. The flag is always to be lowered to half-staff on three holidays: Memorial Day (though the flags are raised to full-staff at noon, a custom dating back to at least 1906), September 11, and National Pearl Harbor Remembrance Day. The governor also has the jurisdiction to order the flag lowered when it is "deemed appropriate". The flag is always to be flown to the right and below the national flag, a guideline specified by the United States Flag Code.

State law mandates that government buildings and schools maintain a "suitable" flagpole for both the national and state flags, and that the flags must be the same size.

Other uses

The state flag is also incorporated into the design of Colorado's state highway markers, though some markers use a representation of the flag that differs slightly from the official version, namely one in which the red letter "C" does not extend into the white stripe and is cut off at the border of the blue stripes instead. The flag is also used as an inspiration behind Colorado's newest state logo, which was unveiled in March 2019.

The Colorado Rapids, who compete in Major League Soccer and play in the Denver area, played in an alternate kit for part of the 2017 season with colors inspired by the state flag: the top was yellow with blue accents, and the shorts were blue with yellow accents.

The courthouse in Mesa County, Colorado, made headlines in 2007 when county commissioners realized its flagpole was flying only the national flag, making it one of the few government buildings in the state that did not fly the state flag, though no reason was given for the state flag's absence. The flag enjoyed renewed popularity during the 2010s, with shirts, decals, and other items incorporating the design seeing increased demand.

See also

Seal of Colorado
List of Colorado state symbols

Notes

References

United States state flags
Flag
 
Flags introduced in 1964
1964 establishments in Colorado